Un Nuevo Amor (English A new love) is the 9th studio album by Mexican pop singer Daniela Romo. This album was released on 1996 and it was produced by one of the greatest producers of the 80's and 90's "Danilo Vaona". All the songs were written by Daniela, "Danilo Vaona" and "Federico Vaona". The music video for the single "Mátame" was nominated for a Lo Nuestro Award. This album was a return to the pop genre after the commercial and critical failure of her the cover album of
rancheras La Cita, this was also her last album to make a significant impact on the Billboard charts and to be recognized in some way by the music industry awards.

Track listing
Tracks:
 Me gusta J. S. Bach
 Un nuevo amor
 Yo soy la dueña
 Mátame
 Una aventura
 Te amaré hasta el final
 Las mujeres
 Poesias
 No soy ella
 Ni contigo ni sin ti
 Quiero saber

Singles
 Mátame
 Me gusta J. S. Bach
 Una aventura

Singles charts

References

1996 albums
Daniela Romo albums